This is a tentative list of butterfly species found in the Indian state of Meghalaya.

Family Papilionidae 
 Graphium sarpedon (Linnaeus, 1758) 
 Graphium antiphates (Cramer, 1775)
 Papilio clytia Linnaeus, 1758
 Papilio demoleus Linnaeus, 1758
 Papilio helenus Linnaeus, 1758 
 Papilio polyctor Boisduval, 1836 
 Papilio polytes romulus Cramer, [1775]
 Papilio protenor Cramer, 1775 
 Papilio nephelus Boisduval, 1836 
 Troides helena (Linnaeus, 1758) 
 Atrophaneura aidoneus Doubleday, 1845 
 Pachliopta aristolochiae (Fabricius, 1775) 
 Byasa dasarada (Moore, 1857) 
 Byasa polyeuctes (Doubleday, 1842)

Family Pieridae 
 Aporia agathon (Gray) 
 Appias lyncida (Cramer) 
 Appias pandione (Geyer) 
 Catopsilia crocale (Cramer) 
 Catopsilia pyranthe (Linnaeus) 
 Colias electo fieldi Menetries
 Delias acalis (Godart) 
 Delias pasithoe (Linnaeus) 
 Delias belladonna (Fabricius) 
 Delias descombesi (Boisduval) 
 Delias hyparete (Linnaeus) 
 Eurema blanda silhetana (Wallace)
 Eurema brigitta rubella (Wallace)
 Eurema hecabe (Linnaeus) 
 Eurema leata (Boisduval) 
 Ixias pyrene (Linnaeus) 
 Pieis brassicae nepalensis (Doubleday)
 Pieis canidia (Sparrman) 
 Pieis napi (Linnaeus) 
 Prioneris thestylis (Doubleday)

Family Nymphalidae 
 Parantica aglea (Stoll) 
 Danaus chrysippus (Linnaeus)
 Danaus genutia (Cramer)
 Danaus melaneus (Cramer)
 Danaus sita (Kollar) 
 Euploea core (Cramer) 
 Euploea mulciber (Cramer) 
 Lethe confusa Aurivillius 
 Lethe verma (Kollar) 
 Lethe yama (Moore) 
 Lethe vindhya (C. Felder) 
 Melanitis leda ismene (Cramer)
 Melanitis phedima (Stoll) 
 Melanitis zitenius (Herbst) 
 Ypthima nareda (Kollar) 
 Ypthima sakra Moore 
 Elymnias hypermnestra Linnaeus 
 Elymnias malelas (Hewitson) 
 Ethope himachala (Moore)
 Thaumantis diores Doubleday 
 Argynnis childreni Gray 
 Argynnis hyperbius (Johanssen) 
 Argynnis laodice (Pallas) 
 Cethosia biblis (Drury) 
 Cethosia cyane (Drury) 
 Cirrochroa aoris Doubleday 
 Cyrestis thyodamas (Boisduval) 
 Ergolis merione (Cramer) 
 Eriboea dolon (Westwood) 
 Eriboea arja (Felder) 
 Neptis hordonia Stoll 
 Neptis hylas Moore 
 Neptis nandina Moore 
 Neptis yeburyi Butler 
 Pantoporia perius (Linnaeus) 
 Pantoporia selanophora (Kollar) 
 Phalanta phalantha (Drury) 
 Junonia almana (Linnaeus) 
 Junonia atlites (Linnaeus) 
 Junonia hierta (Fabricius) 
 Junonia iphita (Cramer) 
 Junonia lemonias (Linnaeus) 
 Junonia orithya (Linnaeus) 
 Kaniska canace (Linnaeus) 
 Vanessa cardui (Linnaeus) 
 Vanessa indica (Herbst) 
 Kallima inachus (Boisduval) 
 Cynthia erota (Fabricius) 
 Chersonesia risa (Doubleday) 
 Symbrenthia hypselis (Godart) 
 Hestina nama (Doubleday) 
 Apatura ambica (Kollar) 
 Stibochiona nicea (Gray) 
 Charaxes polyxena (Cramer) 
 Issoria sinha (Kollar) 
 Euthalia phemius (Doubleday) 
 Euthalia lepidea (Butler) 
 Doleschallia bisaltide (Cramer)
 Acraea issoria (Hübner)

Family Riodinidae 
 Abisara chela (de Nicéville) 
 Zemeros flegyas (Cramer)

Family Lycaenidae 
 Heliophorus androcles (Hewitson) 
 Heliophorus brahma (Moore) 
 Jamides alecto (Felder) 
 Zizeeria maha (Kollar)

Family Hesperiidae 
 Badamia exclamationis (Fabricius) 
 Celaenorrhinus leucocera (Kollar) 
 Notocrypta curvifacia (Felder) 
 Pelopidas mathias (Fabricius) 
 Udaspes folus (Cramer)

References

See also 
 Butterfly
 List of butterflies of India
 List of butterflies of the Western Ghats
 Fauna of India

Meghalaya
B
Butterflies
M